Erazmo Bernard Tićac (1904, Žurkovo - 1968) was Croatian shipbuilding engineer from Žurkovo near Kostrena. He worked for American Design Company George G. Sharp Inc. He is well known for being the main ship design engineer of NS Savannah, the first commercial, passenger-cargo ship of nuclear power.

See also
 List of Croatian inventors

References

Croatian engineers
Croatian inventors
People from Rijeka
1904 births
1968 deaths
Yugoslav inventors
Yugoslav engineers